Fengyang She Ethnic Township is an ethnic township under the jurisdiction of Cangnan County, Wenzhou City , Zhejiang Province, People's Republic of China.

Administrative divisions 
, Fengyang She Ethnic Township has jurisdiction over the following village-level administrative divisions: Dingbao Village, Guidun Village, Heshan Village, Lingbian Village, and Fengyang Village.

References 

Township-level divisions of Zhejiang
Cangnan County
She ethnic townships